Poussette may refer to :
 a character in Flup, Nénesse, Poussette and Cochonnet, a minor comic by Hergé
 a character in Manon, an opéra comique in five acts by Jules Massenet